Morningside Hospital was a 125-bed hospital located at 8711 South Harvard Boulevard, Los Angeles, California. The facility opened in early 1958. An August 1980 Los Angeles Times article indicated that the closing date of Morningside would be September 15, 1980, citing financial losses and competition from larger hospitals. Its emergency room closed two weeks before the hospital itself.

Morningside was one of the filming locations for Halloween II (1981), Fast Times at Ridgemont High (1982), 10 to Midnight (1983) and V: The Final Battle (1984).

After its closure the hospital was abandoned and then demolished in 2003. That same year construction of the Harvard Yard Senior Apartments began on the former hospital site, with funding provided by the Los Angeles Housing Department.

References 

1958 establishments in California
Defunct hospitals in California
1980 disestablishments in California
Hospitals established in 1958
Hospitals disestablished in 1980
Demolished buildings and structures in Los Angeles
Buildings and structures demolished in 2003